WCGX is a classic hits and oldies formatted broadcast radio station licensed to Galax, Virginia, serving Carroll and Grayson counties and Independent City of Galax in Virginia. WCGX is owned and operated by Twin County Broadcasting Corporation.

History
WCGX launched on February 1, 1947, as WBOB. At noon on April 1, 2016, the station changed its format from Southern Gospel to Classic Hits and Oldies, branded as "The Cat". The station also changed its callsign, from WWWJ to WCGX, on the same day.

References

External links
The Cat Online

1947 establishments in Virginia
Classic hits radio stations in the United States
Oldies radio stations in the United States
Radio stations established in 1947
CGX